The Black Mountains ( or sometimes ) are a group of hills spread across parts of Powys and Monmouthshire in southeast Wales, and extending across the England–Wales border into Herefordshire. They are the easternmost of the four ranges of hills that comprise the Brecon Beacons National Park, and are frequently confused with the westernmost, which is known as the Black Mountain. The Black Mountains may be roughly defined as those hills contained within a triangle defined by the towns of Abergavenny in the southeast, Hay-on-Wye in the north and the village of Llangors in the west. Other gateway towns to the Black Mountains include Talgarth and Crickhowell. The range of hills is well known to walkers and ramblers for the ease of access and views from the many ridge trails, such as that on the Black Hill (Herefordshire) at the eastern edge of the massif. The range includes the highest public road in Wales at Gospel Pass, and the highest point in southern England at Black Mountain.

Name 
In his description of a Blak Montayne, the antiquarian John Leland refers to a massif extending between Carmarthen and Monmouth i.e. what is now considered to be the Brecon Beacons in the wider modern sense of that term, thus including the Black Mountain far to the west and the intervening high ground. There is a suggestion too that the names Hatterrall Hill and Mynydd y Gader may also once have been used to apply to the entire range of the Black Mountains though the former later became confined to the vicinity of its eastern ridge. The latter is now recognised in Pen y Gader-fawr (Pen y Gadair Fawr) and Gader Fawr (Gadair Fawr); names applied to the hill at SO 229288. Cadair, mutated to 'gadair' and anglicised as 'gader', means 'seat' or 'chair' in Welsh. The Welsh name for these hills is traditionally Y Mynydd Du ('the black mountain') though in more recent times the name Y Mynyddoedd Duon ('the black mountains') has been used, being a retranslation from the English.

Mountains

Its secondary summit Pen y Gadair Fawr at  has a more distinctive peak shape. On the eastern ridge, the  peak of Black Mountain stands on the Wales-England border, and is the highest point in England south of Great Whernside in Yorkshire. Other summits towards the northern end are Hay Bluff (Welsh: Penybegwn), Rhos Dirion,  and Lord Hereford's Knob or Twmpa, .

Outlying summits, all of which are classed as Marilyns, include the Sugar Loaf (Welsh: Pen-y-Fal), Mynydd Troed and Mynydd Llangorse.  The lower and separate hills of Allt yr Esgair, Myarth, Bryn Arw and Ysgyryd Fawr (also known as 'The Skirrid', Skyrrid or 'Holy Mountain') are scattered along the southern fringe of the Black Mountains.

In his work People of the Black Mountains, Raymond Williams described the Black Mountains thus:See this layered sandstone in the short mountain grass. Place your right hand on it, palm downward. See where the summer sun rises and where it stands at noon. Direct your index finger midway between them. Spread your fingers, not widely. You now hold this place in your hand.

The six rivers rise in the plateau towards your wrist. The first river, now called Mynwy, flows at the outside edge of your thumb. The second river, now called Olchon, flows between your thumb and the first finger, to join the Mynwy at the top of your thumb. The third river, now called Honddu, flows between your first and second fingers and then curves to join the Mynwy. The fourth river, now called Grwyne Fawr, flows between your second and third fingers and then curves the other way, south, to join the fifth river, now called Grwyne Fechan, that has been flowing between your third and your outside finger. The sixth river, now called Rhiangoll, flows at the edge of your outside finger.

This is the hand of the Black Mountains, the shape first learned. Your thumb is Crib y Gath. Your first finger is Curum and Hateral. Your second finger is Ffawyddog, with Tal y Cefn and Bal Mawr at its knuckles. Your third finger is Gadair Fawr. Your outside finger is Allt Mawr, from Llysiau to Cerrig Calch and its nail is Crug Hywel. On the high plateau of the back of your hand are Twyn y Llech and Twmpa, Rhos Dirion, Waun Fach and Y Das. You hold their shapes and their names.

Geology

Bedrock
The Black Mountains are composed almost exclusively of rocks assigned to the Old Red Sandstone and dating from the Devonian period. This thick sedimentary sequence comprises sandstones, mudstones, siltstones and numerous thin limestones. The exception is the summit area of Pen Cerrig-calch where a thin sequence of Carboniferous rocks occur, an outlier of the more extensive outcrop to the south of the Usk valley. The lower slopes of these hills are formed from the mudstone-rich St Maughans beds at the top of which lies a calcrete – a discontinuous limestone band known as the Ffynnon Limestone.  Above this are the sandstone-dominated Senni Beds which form the upper reaches of much of the range.  Higher again are the Brownstones which form the summit areas of the central and southern parts of the range.

The Old Red Sandstone extends back into the late Silurian period and forward into the earliest part of the Carboniferous period. The body of rock, or facies, is dominated by alluvial sediments and conglomerates at its base, and progresses to a combination of dunes, lakes and river sediments. The familiar red colour of these rocks arises from the presence of iron oxide but not all the Old Red Sandstone is red or sandstone — the sequence also includes conglomerates, mudstones, siltstones and thin limestones and colours can range from grey and green through red to purple.

Glacial legacy

The area lay at the margins of the British ice-sheet during the ice ages; these hills were shaped by ice from a source in mid-Wales rather than generating any major glaciers of their own. Non-local rock fragments within the glacial till show that Wye valley ice penetrated the Rhiangoll valley from the north, moving over the low col at Pengenffordd. No such evidence has been found in the Vale of Ewyas though the profile of this valley strongly suggests the presence of a major glacier.  The valleys of the Grwyne Fawr and Grwyne Fechan were probably ice-free during the last ice age. One result of the over-steepening of valley sides by glacial action is the suite of landslips affecting the range, notably in the Vale of Ewyas. The most impressive of all is that at Darren and Cwmyoy. Another impressive set of landslip forms can be seen at Black Darren and Red Darren  ('Darren' signifies 'edge' in Welsh) on the eastern side of the Hatterrall ridge west of Longtown. Another, at the northern end of the Skirrid just to the east of Abergavenny, is perhaps most commonly seen, and the section of the mountain shows the landslip prominently when seen from the north, but is also visible from the south such is the scale of the feature.

Exploitation
Scattered around the range are innumerable small quarries, virtually all of which now lie abandoned, once a source of walling and roofing stone for local use. In places the thin Devonian limestones were worked to feed limekilns for the production of lime for agricultural use and in buildings. Old Red Sandstone has also frequently been used in buildings in Herefordshire, Monmouthshire and the former Brecknockshire (now south Powys) of south Wales.

Activities in the Black Mountains 
The area is popular for hillwalkers, mountainbikers and horseriders. The Offa's Dyke National Trail runs along the border between England and Wales, whilst both the Beacons Way and the Marches Way also pass through the Black Mountains.  The Three Rivers Ride runs along the northern slopes of the massif. The range's northern escarpment offers opportunities for gliding, at places like the Black Mountains Gliding Club in Talgarth, hang gliding and paragliding as winds are forced up and over the hills. Exercise Long Reach takes place in the Black Mountains.

Local attractions

There are several villages and hamlets in this area. The Skirrid Mountain Inn has been claimed as the oldest public house in Wales and mentioned in records from AD 1100. Antiquities include Llanthony Priory in the Vale of Ewyas, ruined Craswall Priory, Tretower Castle, Tretower Court, the Iron Age hill fort of Crug Hywel, and the remains of Castell Dinas, an 11th to 13th century castle built on the site of an Iron Age hillfort between Talgarth and Crickhowell. Cwmyoy and Partrishow churches are also located nearby.
The youth hostel at Capel-y-ffin closed in late 2007. The town of books or Hay-on-Wye lies just to the north. It was the first booktown to be established, and there are more than two dozen second-hand bookshops.

Towns and villages 
Settlements in and around the Black Mountains include Hay-on-Wye, Llangors, Talgarth, Crickhowell, Cwmdu, each in Powys, Abergavenny in Monmouthshire and Longtown in Herefordshire. Many act as bases for accessing the hills all year round.

Cultural associations 
The controversial artist and typeface designer Eric Gill lived at Capel-y-ffin between 1924 and 1928. The artist and poet David Jones worked in the area during the same period.

Fiction 
Books set in or around the Black Mountains include:
 People of the Black Mountains by Raymond Williams (two books of an intended trilogy)
 On The Black Hill by Bruce Chatwin (also adapted as a film)
 Resistance by Owen Sheers (adapted as a film in 2011)
 Running for the Hills: a family story by Horatio Clare

References

External links
Local geology explained

 
Mountain ranges of the Brecon Beacons National Park
Landforms of Powys
Landforms of Monmouthshire
Landforms of Herefordshire
Sites of Special Scientific Interest in Brecknock
Sites of Special Scientific Interest in Herefordshire
Mountain ranges of Wales